The Fletcher Bay–Brownsville–Manzanita route was a shipping route that originated from Seattle, Washington.  The route included stops at Fletcher Bay, Brownsville, and Manzanita.

As of January 1, 1917, the Kitsap County Transportation Company was operating steamboats on the route.  The company also operated the motor vessel Suquamish on the route.

Notes

References

 Kline, Mary S., and Bayless, G.A., Ferryboats – A Legend on Puget Sound, Bayless Books, Seattle, WA 1983 
 Public Service Commission of Washington, Complainant, v. Kitsap County Transportation Company, Respondent, Case No. 4274, published in State of Washington, Public Service Commission, Annual Report (1916), at page 150 (accessed 06-04-11)]

Steamship routes in Washington (state)
History of Kitsap County, Washington